La Cause du peuple was a French newspaper. The newspaper was founded on 1 May 1968 by Roland Castro. It was press organ of the Gauche prolétarienne.

See also
 May 1968 events in France
 Mao-Spontex

References

Bibliography
 Collectif, Les nouveaux partisans : Histoire de la gauche prolétarienne, Éditions Al Dante, 2015, .

External links
 History of the Gauche prolétarienne

French-language communist newspapers
Defunct newspapers published in France
Publications established in 1968
Publications disestablished in 1978
Maoism in France
May 1968 events in France